Etablissement Notre-Dame-de-la-Compassion is a Catholic private school institution in Val-d'Oise, France, in the Paris metropolitan area. It includes:
Lycée Privé Catholique Notre-Dame-de-la-Compassion (also including a junior high school or collège) in Pontoise
Lycée Notre-Dame de la Compassion Elisabeth Molé (technological and vocational high school) in Jouy-le-Moutier

Lycée Elisabeth Molé opened in January 2012.

References

External links
 Etablissement Notre-Dame-de-la-Compassion 

Private schools in France
Lycées in Val-d'Oise
Lycées in Cergy-Pontoise
Catholic secondary schools in France